Brigadier-General George Augustus Stewart Cape  (28 March 1867 – 18 March 1918) was a brigadier general in the 39th Division, Royal Artillery of the British Army during World War I.

Cape was born in Lee, Kent (now in London), the son of George Augustus Cape, an author and co-founder of the accounting firm Cape & Dalgleish, and Mary Catherine Cape. He was educated at Charterhouse School in Surrey.

He was commissioned into the Royal Artillery as a second lieutenant on 13 November 1889, promoted to lieutenant on 13 November 1892, and served in Uganda in 1898, for which he received the East and Central Africa Medal. The following year he was seconded to South Africa where he served on Special Service during the Second Boer War. He was promoted to captain on 9 January 1900.

He was awarded the Companion of St Michael and St George in the 1918 New Year Honours for his efforts during the First World War. He died in active service, in France aged 50 and is remembered at a cemetery in Péronne, Somme.

References 

Hart's Army list, 1901

1918 deaths
1867 births
British Army brigadiers
Military personnel from Kent
Companions of the Order of St Michael and St George
People educated at Charterhouse School
British Army personnel of the Second Boer War
Royal Artillery officers
British Army generals of World War I
British military personnel killed in World War I